Friscia is a surname. Notable people with the surname include:

 Albert J. Friscia (1911–1989), Italian-American sculptor
 Arline Friscia (1934–2019), American politician